It's My Way! is the first album by folk musician and songwriter Buffy Sainte-Marie. It was released in April 1964 by Vanguard Records. It was later released in Britain in the spring of 1965 by Fontana Records. Though the album did not chart, it proved influential in the folk community. It is most famous for two widely covered folk standards, "Universal Soldier" and "Cod'ine", as well as "Now That the Buffalo's Gone", a lament about the continued confiscation of Indian lands, as evidenced by the building of the Kinzua Dam in about 1964. The cover features a mouthbow, which was to be a trademark of her sound on her first three albums.

In 2016, It's My Way! was inducted by the Library of Congress into the National Recording Registry. In 2020 the album was named as one of two jury vote winners, alongside Main Source's Breaking Atoms, of the Polaris Heritage Prize at the 2020 Polaris Music Prize.

Reception

Writing for Allmusic, music critic William Ruhlman gave the album 5 of 5 stars and wrote "This is one of the most scathing topical folk albums ever made... Even decades later, the album's power is moving and disturbing."

Track listing

Personnel
Buffy Sainte-Marie – vocals, guitar, arrangements
Patrick Sky – second guitar on "He Lived Alone in Town"
Art Davis – bass on "Now That the Buffalo's Gone"

References

1964 debut albums
Buffy Sainte-Marie albums
Albums produced by Maynard Solomon
Vanguard Records albums
United States National Recording Registry recordings
United States National Recording Registry albums